Meet the Parents is a film series following the character Greg Focker (Ben Stiller) as he interacts with his family and in-laws. The series is made up of three movies: Meet the Parents (2000), Meet the Fockers (2004), and Little Fockers (2010). The series primarily stars Stiller, Robert De Niro, Teri Polo, Blythe Danner, Owen Wilson, Dustin Hoffman, and Barbra Streisand. The three films earned over $1.15 billion at the box office.

1992 independent film

Before the remake in 2000, Greg Glienna and Mary Ruth Clarke cowrote the original independent film, Meet the Parents, in 1992. Glienna also directed and starred in the film as the main protagonist, Greg: an advertising agent who travels with his fiancée Pam to meet her parents but sets off a series of accidents and causes the family to fall apart.

Several years after the film's release, Universal Pictures purchased the rights to the independent film. After hiring screenwriter Jim Herzfeld to expand the script, a new version of Meet the Parents was filmed and released in October 2000.

Films

Meet the Parents (2000)

Gaylord "Greg" Focker (Ben Stiller) is a nurse living in Chicago. He intends to propose to his girlfriend Pam Byrnes (Teri Polo), but his plan is disrupted when he learns that Pam's sister's fiancé had asked Pam's father for permission before proposing. Greg and Pam travel to Pam's parents' house to attend Pam's sister's wedding. Greg hopes to propose to Pam in front of her family after receiving her father's permission. His plan, however, is put on hold after the airline loses his luggage which contains the engagement ring.

At the Byrnes's house, Greg meets Pam's father Jack (Robert De Niro), mother Dina (Blythe Danner) and their beloved cat Mr. Jinx. Jack takes an instant dislike to Greg and openly criticizes him for his choice of career as a male nurse and whatever else he sees as a difference between Greg and the Byrnes family. Greg attempts to impress Jack, but his efforts fail. Greg becomes even more uncomfortable after he receives an impromptu lie detector test from Jack and later learns from Pam that her father is a retired CIA counterintelligence officer.

Meeting the rest of Pam's family and friends, Greg still feels like an outsider. Despite efforts to impress the family, Greg's inadvertent actions make him an easy target for ridicule and anger. He accidentally gives Pam's sister a black eye during a pool volleyball mishap, uses a malfunctioning toilet that floods the Byrnes's backyard with sewage, spills Jack's mother's ashes while trying to open a champagne bottle, sets the wedding altar on fire, and unwittingly leads Jack to think he is a marijuana user. Later, Greg loses Mr. Jinx and replaces him with a stray whose tail he spray paints to make him look like Mr. Jinx. Also, after Greg spray-paints the cat's tail, the cat is left alone in the house while the whole family is out at dinner, and when the family returns home, they find that the stray cat has damaged and destroyed many of the wedding possessions. It is then that the truth is revealed about the cat and everybody, especially Jack, is absolutely furious with Greg.

Jack denies turning Pam against Greg, saying that Greg did that himself through his dishonesty.  Jack says that he always demands honesty, which is when Greg reveals to Pam that Jack never retired and is still in the CIA. Jack is forced to admit that Greg is correct. Unfortunately for Greg, the incident in which he observed Jack with one of Jack's associates and carrying out a phone call in Thai was actually Jack preparing a surprise honeymoon for Pam's sister and her fiancé which makes Jack even angrier with Greg. Jack reveals that the person he met at the supermarket was his travel agent, and that he was receiving Debbie and her fiancé's visas.

By now, the entire Byrnes family, including Pam, agrees that it is best for Greg to leave. Unwillingly, Greg goes to the airport and is detained by airport security for refusing to check in his recently returned luggage. Back at the Byrnes household, Jack tries to convince Dina and Pam that Greg would have been an unsuitable husband for Pam. Upon receiving admonishment from both Dina and Pam over his picking apart of Greg and any other man whom Pam brings home, Jack realizes that Pam truly loves Greg. Jack rushes to the airport, convinces airport security to release Greg, and brings him back to the Byrnes household.

Greg proposes to Pam. She accepts, and her parents agree that they should now meet Greg's parents. After Debbie's wedding, Jack views footage of Greg recorded by hidden cameras that he had placed strategically around their house. As Jack watches Greg and hears what Greg has to say, Jack gets furious at Greg for the insults toward Jack and Jack's son, Denny.

Meet the Fockers (2004)

Gaylord "Greg" Focker (Ben Stiller) and his fiancée Pam Byrnes (Polo) decide to introduce their parents to each other. They first fly to Oyster Bay, Long Island, to pick up Pam's father, retired CIA operative Jack Byrnes (De Niro), her mother Dina (Danner) and one-year-old nephew Little Jack. But rather than going to the airport as planned, Jack decides to drive the family to Miami to meet the Fockers in his new RV.

Once they arrive, they are greeted by Greg's eccentric but fun-loving and amiable father, Bernie (Hoffman), and mother, Roz (Streisand), who is a sex therapist for elder couples. Worried that Jack may be put off by the Fockers' lifestyle, Greg convinces Roz to pretend that she is a yoga instructor for the weekend. Though Jack and Bernie get off to a good start, small cracks begin to form between Jack and the Fockers, due to their contrasting personalities. Things are made worse when a chase between the Fockers' dog, Moses, and the Byrnes' cat, Jinx, culminates with Jinx flushing Moses down the RV's toilet, forcing Bernie to destroy it to save Moses, and later on when Bernie accidentally injures Jack's back during a game of football.

Pam, meanwhile, informs Greg that she is pregnant, but the two decide to keep it a secret from Jack, who is unaware they are having sex. Jack, however, becomes suspicious of Greg's character again when they are introduced to the Focker's housekeeper, Isabel Villalobos (Alanna Ubach), with whom Bernie reveals Greg had a sexual affair 15 years earlier. Jack later takes the RV to Isabel's 15-year-old son, Jorge (Ray Santiago), to fix the toilet, but is disturbed by Jorge's striking resemblance to Greg and begins to suspect he may be Greg's son with Isabel. Meanwhile, Roz, Bernie and Dina realize Pam is pregnant, but promise not to tell Jack. Growing envious of Bernie and Roz' active sex life, Dina consults Roz on sex tips in order to seduce Jack, but none of them work.

Things eventually come to a crunch when Greg is left alone to babysit Little Jack, whom Jack has been raising via the Ferber method. Despite Jack's instructions to leave Little Jack to self-soothe, Greg is unable bear to listen to Little Jack's cries and tends to the boy to cheer him up, turning the television on to Sesame Street, acting funny and inadvertently teaching Little Jack to say "asshole". A brief phone call from Roz is long enough for Little Jack to wander out of his pen (after being accidentally opened by Jinx), put on Scarface and glue his hands to a rum bottle. After a furious argument with the Fockers and his own family (though amends are quickly made), Jack reverts to his old ways and sends Greg and Jorge's hair samples for a DNA test, while inviting Jorge to the Fockers' planned engagement party in hopes of getting Greg to admit he is Jorge's father.

At the engagement party, Jack introduces Greg to Jorge, and later when Greg refuses to admit Jorge is his son, Jack injects him with a truth serum to make him talk. On stage, Greg blurts out that Pam is pregnant and that Jorge is indeed his son (in a comically Darth Vader-esque manner) before finally passing out. When the others realize Jack's actions the next day, another argument ensues and Dina admits that they all knew Pam was pregnant and deliberately did not tell him. Shocked and hurt by this, Jack leaves with his grandson. Bernie and Greg give pursuit, but are tasered and arrested by an overzealous, corrupt deputy sheriff, Officer Vern LeFlore (Tim Blake Nelson), for speeding. Jack returns to defend them after being informed Greg is not Jorge's father (his real father turns out to be a baseball player who also resembles Greg), but the overzealous LeFlore tasers and arrests him as well. In their cell, Greg, Jack and Bernie make up and are released by the local judge, Ira (Shelley Berman), who is a student of Roz and close friend of the Focker family.

Greg and Pam are married that weekend by Pam's ex-fiancée (Owen Wilson). During the party, Jack asks Roz for some sex tips and sneaks into the RV with Dina.

Little Fockers (2010)

Gaylord "Greg" Focker (Stiller) is preparing to celebrate his twins' fifth birthday party. Things seem to go awry when Greg's father-in-law Jack Byrnes (De Niro) visits. Recently, Jack has been diagnosed with a heart condition and become embittered by his daughter Debbie's divorce from her husband, Bob (whose marriage was the social event in Meet the Parents and how Jack was introduced to Greg), for cheating on her with a nurse. Jack's plan was originally to name Bob as his successor of the Byrnes family, but he decides to pass the role on to Greg, naming him "The Godfocker". Despite Greg begrudgingly accepting the role, Jack begins to suspect Greg of infidelity when he sees him with a drug rep, Andi Garcia (Alba), who openly flirts with him, and the presence of Sustengo erection pills in Greg's house, which prompts Jack to think Greg is no longer sexually attracted to his wife, Pam (Polo). Furthermore, Jack starts to doubt Greg's ability to provide for his family when he appears reluctant to send his children to a private school.

During a medical conference promoting Sustengo, Greg meets Bob at a bar. Bob tells Greg of Jack's original intention to name him as successor, "The Bobfather", and expresses relief and happiness at leaving Jack's family, which makes Greg slightly uncomfortable. Jack, for his part, starts to speak with Pam about the possibility of divorcing Greg and renewing her relationship with her ex-fiancée, Kevin Rawley (Wilson). Eventually, following a row at a clinic, Greg runs away from home to his and Pam's unfinished new house, where he is paid a visit by Andi, who tries to cheer him up with takeout and wine, but Andi soon becomes so drunk that she makes an aggressive sexual pass at Greg. While looking for Greg to apologise and bring him home, Jack pulls up to the house and sees, through the window, what he believes to be Greg and Andi having sex while Greg is trying to rebuff Andi's advances. Disgusted, Jack merely leaves, but tells Dina and Pam that he was unable to find Greg.

At the twins' birthday party, Greg's parents, Bernie (Hoffman) and Roz (Streisand) rejoin the family, but Jack, enraged at Greg's apparent infidelity, engages Greg in a physical fight, despite Greg insisting that Andi was drunk and he was rebuffing her. The fight culminates with Jack having a heart attack and collapsing. As he is taken away by paramedics, Jack quietly admits that he now believes Greg after feeling his carotid artery, which remained stable while Greg was claiming his innocence.

Four months later on Christmas Day, Greg and Pam's parents come to spend Christmas with them in their new house. Greg's parents (who are Jewish) give Jack a present of a kippah, informing him they traced his family roots back while nursing him back to health, discovering he is part Jewish. Bernie informs Greg and Pam that he and Roz have sold their island home and are moving to Chicago only two houses down from theirs. Jack and Dina decide they will move too, because they also want to be close to their grandchildren. Greg and Pam try to wean their respective parents off the idea.

Legacy
The success of Meet the Parents was initially responsible for a 2002 NBC reality television show entitled Meet My Folks in which a young woman's love interest, vying for her family's approval, is interrogated by the woman's overprotective father with the help of a lie detector machine. In September 2002, NBC also aired a situation comedy entitled In-Laws. During the development of the sitcom, NBC called it "a Meet the Parents project" which prompted an investigation by Universal into whether NBC was infringing on Universal's copyright. Universal did not pursue any action against NBC but neither show lasted more than one season. Ironically, NBC and Universal merged on a corporate level in 2004, just two years after this.

On July 18, 2005, a regularly scheduled American Airlines flight from Fort Lauderdale-Hollywood International Airport to San Juan, Puerto Rico, had to be diverted back to Fort Lauderdale shortly after take-off due to a bomb threat. The pilot turned the airplane around approximately 40 minutes into the flight after a flight attendant found a crumpled napkin that read "Bomb, bomb, bomb ... meet the parents", a clear reference to the scene in which Ben Stiller's character repeatedly shouts the word "bomb" while being detained by airport security. The airplane was met by a bomb squad of the local sheriff's office as well as the FBI whose agents questioned the plane's 176 passengers about the note.

Reception

Critical reception

Box office performance

Recurring characters

Note: A gray cell indicates character did not appear in that film.

References

External links
 
 
 

American comedy films
Films set in New York
Films set in Chicago
Films shot in New York
American interfaith romance films
Trilogies
Universal Pictures franchises
DreamWorks Pictures films
Paramount Pictures franchises
Film series introduced in 2000